Tamien may have several meanings:

 Tamien, San Jose, California
 Tamyen dialect, an indigenous language of California
 Tamien Nation, a non-profit; see 
 Tamien people, a Native American people in Santa Clara Valley, California
 Tamien Station, a train and light rail station in San Jose, California